Ondřej Hošťálek (born 21 July 1991) is a Czech professional ice hockey player. He played with HC Plzeň in the Czech Extraliga during the 2010–11 season.

References

External links

1991 births
Living people
Czech ice hockey forwards
HC Plzeň players
HC Berounští Medvědi players